The Dar Pomorza is a Polish full-rigged sailing ship built in 1909 which is preserved in Gdynia as a museum ship. She has served as a sail training ship in Germany, France, and Poland. Dar Pomorza won the Cutty Sark Trophy in 1980.

History
The ship was built in 1909 by Blohm & Voss and dedicated in 1910 by Deutscher Schulschiff-Verein as the German training ship Prinzess Eitel Friedrich, named for Duchess Sophia Charlotte of Oldenburg, wife of Prince Eitel Friedrich of Prussia. Her yard no. was 202, her hull was launched on 12 October 1909. In 1920, following World War I, the ship was taken as war-reparations by Great Britain, then brought to France, where she was assigned to the seamen's school at St-Nazaire under the name Colbert. The ship was in 1927 given to Baron de Forrest as compensation for the loss of a sailing yacht. Due to the high costs of refurbishing the ship, she was sold in 1929.

Still bearing the name Prinzess Eitel Friedrich, she was bought by the Polish community of Pomerania for £7,000, as the new training ship for the Polish Naval Academy in Gdynia. She was given the name "Dar Pomorza" (the Gift of Pomerania). In 1930 the ship was repaired and fitted with an auxiliary diesel engine. The experience gained during rebuilding works enabled Danish shipbuilders of Nakskov to build a sail training vessel for their country, the Danmark (still in service). Worth noting is the fact that the ship made her first voyage under Polish colours named (temporarily) "Pomorze" (Pomerania). According to rumours, the name may have been changed in an effort not to name a training ship after a lost one. The same German-written name bore the German pre-dreadnought battleship Pommern, lost (with all hands) during the Battle of Jutland in June 1916. The mentioned first voyage was one under tow of two Dutch tugs ("Poolzee" and "Witte Zee") with a party of Polish and Dutch runners aboard, starting on 26 Dec. 1929 from St. Nazaire, and ending on 9 Jan. 1930 at Nakskov, the ship narrowly escaping destruction in a gale off the Brittany coast. That first voyage of the ship under Polish flag became later famous through some accounts, including one written Mr T. Meissner, the ship's first mate.

During the following years, rebuilt and converted into training unit fitted i/a with an auxiliary Diesel engine, she was used as a training ship, receiving the nickname "White Frigate". In 1934-1935 she travelled around the world (via Panama Canal). During that famous voyage, she called at many ports as the first ship ever under Polish flag. In 1937 a special voyage took her around the famous Cape Horn; thus she became the first ship under Polish Colours to round the famous cape. In 1938 she took part at the famous meeting of Baltic sail training ships at Stockholm, regarded as the predecessor of all the post-war Operation Sail meetings, winning i. a. special respect the skipper of Norwegian sail training vessel Christian Radich. During World War II she was interned in Stockholm. After the war, she was brought to Communist Poland and used as a training ship again.

In 1967 she made a 'second debut', calling at Montreal, Quebec, Canada, during the Expo-Fair and winning general respect for her and her country. In the 1970s she took part in several Operation Sail and Cutty Sark Tall Ships' Races, winning her first race in 1972, taking the 3rd place in 1973, the 4th in 1974 and winning the 1st place and Cutty Sark Trophy in 1980. In 1976, during the famous Operation Sail '76 in the US, her retiring skipper Kazimierz Jurkiewicz was officially greeted by Mr Kjell Thorsen, the skipper of the Norwegian "Christian Radich". The "Dar Pomorza" has been one of several Blohm & Voss-built tall ships, most popular in the world. Her importance to the world's maritime heritage is her origin - she is the younger sister of the (still existing) Grossherzogin Elisabeth, the world's first purpose-built sail training ship. As well, she is the first ship ever to carry the Polish Colours around the world in one voyage (1934–35), thus becoming incomparable to any other existing unit of her sort.

On 15 September 1981 she undertook her last voyage to the Finnish harbour of Kotka, finishing it 13 days later. On 4 August 1982 she was decommissioned and festively replaced by the Dar Młodzieży as a training ship.

Museum ship 

Since 27 May 1983 she has been a museum ship in Gdynia (next to the Błyskawica). She is part of a collection of National Maritime Museum in Gdańsk. In October 2009 the Dar Pomorza celebrated her 100th "birthday". The celebration included her second christening by Mrs Barbara Szczurek, the wife of the Mayor of Gdynia.

Her speed under sail averaged 5 knots, with a 17 knots maximum. Her auxiliary engine was one of the type used in German U-Boats, and her horn, installed after the war, was from the German battleship Gneisenau, scuttled on 27/28 March 1945 at one of the entrances to the harbour of Gdynia.

Sister ships
The three sister ships of Dar Pomorza also survive:
Duchesse Anne (originally Großherzogin Elisabeth)
Schulschiff Deutschland
Statsraad Lehmkuhl (originally Großherzog Friedrich August)

See also
List of large sailing vessels

References

External links

Polish Maritime Museum: Dar Pomorza
Photos of Dar Pormorza (Polish language, archived link)

Gallery 

Museum ships in Poland
Individual sailing vessels
Tall ships of Germany
Training ships of Germany
Tall ships of Poland
Training ships of Poland
Gdynia
Full-rigged ships
1909 ships
Museums in Pomeranian Voivodeship